Darreh Esbar (also Romanized as Darreh Esbar, Dar Āspar, Darreh Espar, and Darreh-ye Aspar) is a village in Heshmatabad Rural District, in the Central District of Dorud County, Lorestan Province, Iran. At the 2006 census, its population was 271, in 53 families.

References 

Towns and villages in Dorud County